Tiffany Espensen (born February 10, 1999) is an American actress. She began her career as a child actress, before becoming known for her teenaged roles, such as Piper in the 2011 Nickelodeon series Bucket & Skinner's Epic Adventures and Belinda in the 2014 Disney XD series Kirby Buckets. Espensen has also appeared in the Marvel Cinematic Universe film Spider-Man: Homecoming (2017).

Early life 
Espensen was born on February 10, 1999, in China, and was adopted by American parents, Robin and Dan Espensen. She has an older brother named Erik. Espensen attended Liberty University majoring in political science and religion. In November 2021, she completed her Masters Degree in Christian Ministries at Grand Canyon University.

Career 
Espensen began her career as a child actress making guest appearances on television series such as Hannah Montana, True Jackson, VP and Zeke and Luther. In 2011, she landed a main role on the Nickelodeon series, Bucket & Skinner's Epic Adventures (2011–2013), on which she played Piper, the little sister of Ashley Argota's character. Espensen followed this up in 2014 with a co-starring role on the Disney XD series Kirby Buckets. In 2016 she was added to the cast of the 2017 feature film Spider-Man: Homecoming, playing the role of Cindy, a role she reprised in the 2018 film Avengers: Infinity War.

Personal life 
Espensen started dating country singer and Bringing Up Bates star Lawson Bates, in February 2021. In October that year, Bates and Espensen were engaged at the Tenuta Larnianone in Siena, Italy. They married on May 12, 2022 in San Diego.

Filmography

References

External links 

1999 births
21st-century American actresses
American actresses of Chinese descent
American adoptees
American child actresses
American film actresses
American television actresses
American voice actresses
Chinese emigrants to the United States
Living people
People from Zhanjiang
Liberty University alumni